Ada Feinberg-Sireni (born 22 April 1930) is a former Israeli politician who served as a member of the Knesset for the Alignment between 1969 and 1974.

Born in Rome in Italy, Feinberg-Sireni made aliyah to Mandatory Palestine in 1934. She was educated in Tel Aviv, and was a member of the Scouts training group established by the Palmach. In 1949 she was amongst the founding members of kibbutz Yir'on. She was a member of the HaKibbutz HaMeuhad movement, and later co-ordinated the youth section of the United Kibbutz Movement. She also worked as a teacher in the Anne Frank Regional School.

In 1969 she was elected to the Knesset on the Alignment list, but lost her seat in the 1973 elections.

References

External links
 

1930 births
Italian emigrants to Mandatory Palestine
Israeli educators
Israeli women educators
Women members of the Knesset
Living people
Alignment (Israel) politicians
Members of the 7th Knesset (1969–1974)
20th-century Israeli women politicians